Sanjay Singh Chauhan (10 October 1961 - 2 October 2014) was an Indian politician. He was the active member of the Rashtriya Lok Dal (RLD) and was a member of Parliament representing Bijnor in Uttar Pradesh state in the 15th Lok Sabha. He was also a Member of State Legislative Assembly, Uttar Pradesh from 1996-2001.

He was the son of Chaudhary Narayan Singh ex Deputy CM of Uttar Pradesh. He graduated with B.A., LL.B., was educated at S.D. Degree College and D.A.V. Degree College, Muzaffar Nagar and Chaudhary Charan Singh University, Meerut.

He was a notable gurjar leader from Uttar Pradesh.

References

  "Fifteenth Lok Sabha: Members Bioprofile"
 Constituency
 NIC Website

External links
 Sanjay Singh Chauhan, Official homepage

Living people
People from Bijnor district
India MPs 2009–2014
Rashtriya Lok Dal politicians
1961 births
People from Muzaffarnagar
Uttar Pradesh MLAs 1997–2002
Lok Sabha members from Uttar Pradesh